

Horst von Usedom (9 March 1906  – 14 October 1970) was a general in the Wehrmacht of Nazi Germany during World War II who commanded the 12th Panzer Division. He was a recipient of the  Knight's Cross of the Iron Cross with Oak Leaves. 

von Usedom surrendered to the Soviet forces in the Courland Pocket in May 1945. He was held prisoner in the Soviet Union until 1955.

Awards and decorations
 Iron Cross (1939) 2nd Class (22 September 1939) & 1st Class  (30 May 1940)
 German Cross in Gold on 29 January 1945 as Oberst in Panzergrenadier-Regiment 108
 Knight's Cross of the Iron Cross with Oak Leaves
 Knight's Cross on 31 December 1941 as Major and commander of Kradschützen Battalion 61
 809th Oak Leaves on 28 March 1945 as Oberst and commander of Panzer Brigade "Kurland"

References

Citations

Bibliography

 
 
 

1906 births
1970 deaths
People from Celle
Major generals of the German Army (Wehrmacht)
Recipients of the Gold German Cross
Recipients of the Knight's Cross of the Iron Cross with Oak Leaves
Reichswehr personnel
German prisoners of war in World War II held by the Soviet Union
People from the Province of Hanover
Military personnel from Lower Saxony
German Army generals of World War II